Ronald Jerry Blye (born December 29, 1943 in Clearwater, Florida) is a former American football running back in the National Football League for the New York Giants and the Philadelphia Eagles.  He played college football at the University of Notre Dame.

References

1943 births
American football running backs
Living people
New York Giants players
Notre Dame Fighting Irish football players
Philadelphia Eagles players
Players of American football from Tampa, Florida